The Tajikistan women's national football team represents Tajikistan in women's association football. The team is governed by the Tajikistan Football Federation (FFT) and competes in AFC (Asian Football Confederation) and CAFA (Central Asian Football Association) women's competitions. The team is currently ranked 144th in the world by FIFA.

History

The international debut
Tajikistan women's football was established in 2013, but it wasn't until 2017 that the women's team had their first international match against the neighboring Kyrgyzstan as a preparation for their 2018 AFC Women's Asian Cup qualification campaign, entering the qualification for the first time Tajikistan hosted the tournament in Dushanbe with the participation of the host of the 2018 AFC Women's Asian Cup Jordan and other five teams including Bahrain, UAE, Iraq, and the Philippines. the Tajiks won their first-ever competitive match against Iraq. eventually Tajikistan ended fifth after losing the following games against the other four teams.

in 2018 Tajikistan was the first Central Asian team to participate in the women's football tournament of Asian Games. they were drawn into a group of East Asian teams with AFC powerhouse North Korea and China PR being in the same group. In that tournament, the Tajik registered their biggest loss (16–0) to both North Korea and China PR. later that year the Tajik team made their first appearance in the AFC Women's Olympic Qualifying Group for the 2020 Olympic Games. Tajikistan which shows interest in hosting international women's Asian tournaments hosted Group  A of the first round of the qualifiers in Hisor's Central Stadium. Tajikistan won their first match against Mongolia four to nil starting the qualifiers with a win that boosted Tajik's hope of advancing to the second round. in their second match with Chinese Taipei, the team lost nine goals to nil. however, the match against the Philippines was the decider. eventually, Tajikistan who scored the opening goal lost after the Philippines came back with three goals to finish at top of Tajikistan. the team finished their qualifying campaign up high with a six-nil win over Singapore, yet their biggest win on the international stage. 2018 was the year for the Tajik women's team as they played 11 matches and to conclude this year the team participate in the inaugural edition of CAFA Women's Championship hosted by Uzbekistan. four central Asian teams alongside Tajikistan participated in the first edition. Tajikistan managed to get two wins in their opening and last game against Kyrgyzstan and Afghanistan respectively. which led them to finish third place.

Team image

Nicknames
The team doesn't have a nickname officially.

Home stadium
Tajikistan plays the majority of their home matches on the Republican Central Stadium, The national team also held official international matches at the Hisor Central stadium.

Kit suppliers

FIFA World Ranking

Results and fixtures

The following is a list of match results in the last 12 months, as well as any future matches that have been scheduled.

Legend

2022

2023

Coaching staff

Current coaching staff

Manager history

Players

Current squad
 The following 23 players were called up for the 2022 CAFA Women's Championship.
 Match dates: 8–20 July 2022
 Caps and goals correct as of: 20 July 2022, after the match against

Recent call-ups
The following players have been called up to the squad in the past 12 months.

Records

*Players in bold are still active, at least at club level.

Most capped players

Top goalscorers

Honours

Regional
CAFA Women's Championship
Appearances (2): 2018, 2022

 Third place (1): 2018

Competitive record

FIFA Women's World Cup

*Draws include knockout matches decided on penalty kicks.

Olympic Games

*Draws include knockout matches decided on penalty kicks.

AFC Women's Asian Cup

*Draws include knockout matches decided on penalty kicks.

Asian Games

*Draws include knockout matches decided on penalty kicks.

CAFA Women's Championship

See also
Tajikistan women's national under-17 football team

References

External links
Official website, FFT.tj 

 
Asian women's national association football teams